Harold Hadley may refer to:

 Harry Hadley (1877–1942), English footballer and football manager
 Harold Hadley (rugby league) (1895–1977), Australian rugby league footballer